The Jajwala Mata temple is located in Pokhran, Rajasthan, India. Jajwala Mata is the kuldevi of the Pushkarna Bhardwaj Vyas dynasty.

References

External links
 Official website

Tourist attractions in Jaisalmer district
Hindu temples in Rajasthan
Shakti temples